Brager is a surname. Notable people with the surname include:

George Brager (1923–2003), American professor of social work
Peter Munch Brager (1806–1869), Norwegian priest and politician
Stacy Bragger (born 1984), Falkland Island journalist and politician

See also
Bager